Jefferson Barracks Marine Soccer Club is an American women's soccer club fielding over thirty teams throughout the St. Louis area.

Honors
National championships (6)
Women's Cup: 2011
Regional Runners-up: 2010, 2012
Women's Amateur: 2001
Women's U-23: 1998, 2004
National Semifinals: 2008, 2009
Women's U-19: 1991
Regional championships (22)
Missouri state championships (74)

Notable former players
Lori Chalupny - 2008 Olympic Gold medalist
Becky Sauerbrunn - 2012 Olympic Gold medalist
Lauren Fowlkes - 2008 U-20 World Cup champion

External links
J.B. Marine homepage
SLYSA homepage

Soccer clubs in St. Louis
Soccer in Missouri
Sports clubs in the United States
Youth soccer in the United States
Association football clubs established in 1978
1978 establishments in Missouri